Sir James Clarke Holt  (26 April 1922 – 9 April 2014), also known as J. C. Holt and Jim Holt, was an English medieval historian, known particularly for his work on Magna Carta. He was the third Master of Fitzwilliam College, Cambridge, serving between 1981 and 1988.

Career
Educated at Bradford Grammar School, Holt's studies at The Queen's College, Oxford, were interrupted by war service with the British Army, including 14 months in north-west Europe in 1944–1945. Returning to The Queen's College in 1945, he graduated with first-class honours in history in 1947, and subsequently took his DPhil with a thesis titled The "Northern" Barons Under John in 1952, at Merton College, Oxford.

He held the positions of Lecturer (1949–1962) and then Professor of Medieval History (1962–65) at the University of Nottingham, Professor of History at the University of Reading (1965–1978) and Professor of Medieval History at the University of Cambridge from 1978 until his retirement in 1988. From 1981 until 1988 he served as the Master of Fitzwilliam College.

He was on the governing body of Abingdon School from 1969 to 1979.

Honours
Holt became a Fellow of the British Academy in 1978 and was its Vice President from 1987 to 1989, was president of the Royal Historical Society (1981–1985), and was knighted for his work as an historian.

Publications
Holt made his name with the book Magna Carta, which came out in its original edition in 1965. In this work he treated the charter in the context of the political framework of its time. The book has since been fully revised, and is still considered authoritative within its field.

He also published other works on the same period, such as The Northerners: A Study in the Reign of King John, and Robin Hood.

Selected works
The Northerners: A Study in the Reign of King John, (1961)
Magna Carta, (1965)
What's in a Name? Family Nomenclature and the Norman Conquest. (The Stenton Lecture 1981). University of Reading, 1982.
Robin Hood, (London, 1982)
Magna Carta and Medieval Government, (1985)
Foundations for the Future: The University of Cambridge, (1995)
Colonial England, 1066–1215, (1997)
 Magna Carta (Cambridge, 2015)

Personal life
Holt married Alice Suley in 1951; they had one son. Holt was "passionate about cricket".

Death
He died on 9 April 2014, aged 91.

References

External links
Transcript of Interview with Prof Sir James Holt (interview took place in Fitzwilliam College, Cambridge, 16 May 2008). Includes photograph & autobiographical details.
MP3 audio file of the Interview with Prof Sir James Holt, 16 May 2008.

1922 births
2014 deaths
People educated at Bradford Grammar School
English historians
Fellows of Fitzwilliam College, Cambridge
Masters of Fitzwilliam College, Cambridge
Fellows of the British Academy
Fellows of The Queen's College, Oxford
Fellows of the Royal Historical Society
Presidents of the Royal Historical Society
Academics of the University of Nottingham
Academics of the University of Reading
Knights Bachelor
Alumni of Merton College, Oxford
Professors of Medieval History (Cambridge)
British medievalists
Corresponding Fellows of the Medieval Academy of America
Governors of Abingdon School